Nyatike is an electoral constituency in Kenya. It is one of eight constituencies of Migori County. There are seven wards in the constituency, all electing members (MCAs) to the Migori County Assembly. The constituency was established for the 1988 elections. 
Being a semi-arid region, residents of Nyatike mainly depend on fishing as the major economic activity. Around the areas of Macalder and Osiri, small-scale gold mining has also become a source of livelihood. Currently, the constituency is a major player in Migori County politics as it has the highest number of voters of the 8 constituencies.

Members of Parliament

Wards

References 

Constituencies in Migori County
Constituencies in Nyanza Province
1988 establishments in Kenya
Constituencies established in 1988